Hymenophyllum cristatum is a species of fern in the family Hymenophyllaceae. It is endemic to Ecuador.  Its natural habitats are subtropical or tropical moist montane forests and subtropical or tropical high-altitude grassland. It is threatened by habitat loss.

References

cristatum
Ferns of Ecuador
Endemic flora of Ecuador
Ferns of the Americas
Near threatened flora of South America
Taxonomy articles created by Polbot